Neal Krause (born 1948) is Marshall H. Becker Collegiate Professor of Public Health at University of Michigan School of Public Health, in Ann Arbor, Michigan.

Biography & awards
Krause was born on December 15, 1948, in Mineola, New York.
Krause obtained a baccalaureate degree from the University of Oklahoma (BBA in marketing and management, 1971), a master's degree in sociology and psychology from Sam Houston State University (MA, 1974), and a doctorate in sociology (University of Akron and Kent State University, 1978).
From 1982 to 1986, Krause worked at the University of Texas Medical Branch as Research Associate, Research Instructor, and Assistant Professor.
In 1986 he joined the Department of Health Behavior and Health Education in the University of Michigan School of Public Health as Associate Professor, and in 2009 he became the Marshall H. Becker Collegiate Professor of Public Health.

In 2002 Krause was identified by the Institute for Scientific Information as one of the 250 most frequently cited social scientists in the 1981-1999 ISI Social Sciences Citation Index data base.

In 2010 Krause won the Richard Kalish Innovative Publication Award for his 2008 book, "Aging in the Church: How Social Relationships Affect Health".

References

External links

Faculty page for Neal Krause (University of Michigan School of Public Health)

1948 births
Living people
American social scientists
University of Michigan faculty
University of Oklahoma alumni
Sam Houston State University alumni
University of Nevada, Reno alumni
University of Akron alumni
Kent State University alumni